Silversea Cruises is a luxury cruise line headquartered in Monaco.  Founded in 1994 by the Vlasov Group of Monaco and the Lefebvre family of Rome, it pioneered all-inclusive cruising with its first ship, Silver Cloud. Since July 2020, it has been owned by Royal Caribbean Group.

History
Silversea was founded in 1994 by a joint venture between V-Ships (previously known as Vlasov Group) of Monaco and Antonio Lefebvre d'Ovidio of Rome. The joint owners had previously been the co-owners of Sitmar Cruises. 

As a marketing strategy the new line introduced all-inclusive fares including gratuities, beverages, port charges, travel insurance, and some complimentary shore excursions.  As about 80 percent of Silversea's customers were expected to come from North America, the line established a sales office in Miami, Florida.

Silversea's first ship, which entered service in April 1994, was followed in January 1995 by a sister ship, .

Both of these ships were enlarged versions of the original two ships, carrying about 100 more passengers. In December 2009, Silversea launched .

On 18 June 2012, Silversea acquired Canodros S.A., an Ecuadorian tourism company that operated in the Galápagos Islands. The purchase of the line also included the former Renaissance ship Galapagos Explorer II.  She was subsequently moved into the "Silversea Expeditions" brand along with Silver Explorer. Silver Galapagos entered service in September 2013.

On 24 July 2013, CNN aired a report of a Silversea cruise ship, Silver Shadow failing a Centers for Disease Control and Prevention (CDC) inspection by hiding trolleys of food in crew cabins.

Silver Discoverer was christened in Singapore in March 2014 and set sail on her inaugural voyage along Australia's Kimberley Coast on 2 April 2014.

Fincantieri delivered the fleet's ninth ship, Silver Muse to Silversea Cruises on 2 April 2017, at its Sestri Ponente shipyard. Silver Muses debut cruise set sail on 10 April 2017, in the Mediterranean Sea. That same year, Silversea announced an order for Silver Moon, a sister ship to Silver Muse, to be built by Fincantieri and delivered in 2020. In May 2018, Silversea announced an order for Silver Dawn, another sister ship of Silver Muse, to be delivered by Fincantieri in 2021.

Acquired by Royal Caribbean 
On 14 June 2018, Royal Caribbean purchased a majority stake in Silversea for approximately $1 billion from Manfredi Lefebvre d'Ovidio, son of cofounder Antonio Lefebvre d'Ovidio, and who had become the sole owner of the cruise line. Following the announcement, Silversea ordered three new ships: two Evolution-class vessels to be built by Meyer Werft to be delivered beginning 2022 and one expedition vessel from Shipyard De Hoop to be delivered in March 2020.

In July 2020, Royal Caribbean Group acquired the remaining shares of Silversea from Heritage Cruise Holding in exchange for 5.2 million shares of Royal Caribbean Group stock.

On 14 June 2022, early reports came out that Silversea was very interested in purchasing the Crystal Endeavor from the defunct Crystal Cruises brand, with records of the trademarked name Silver Endeavor being filled. However, it was further reported on June 28, that both The Ritz-Carlton Yacht Collection and the former owners of Silversea, Heritage Cruise Holding (who recently purchased the two Crystal ships and the entire brand) were still interested in purchasing the vessel as well. Silversea’s purchase was confirmed in July 2022, with a purchase price of $275 million, and the ship being renamed Silver Endeavor.

Fleet

Current fleet

Future ships

Former ships

See also
 Sitmar Cruises
 Oceania Cruises
 Regent Seven Seas Cruises
 Seabourn Cruise Line

References

External links

Cruise lines
Transport companies established in 1994
Brands of Monaco
1994 establishments in Europe
2020 mergers and acquisitions